Tina Grassow (born 1 May 1988) is a German former short track speed skater. She competed in the women's 3000 metre relay event at the 2006 Winter Olympics.

References

External links
 

1988 births
Living people
German female short track speed skaters
Olympic short track speed skaters of Germany
Short track speed skaters at the 2006 Winter Olympics
People from Sebnitz
Sportspeople from Saxony
21st-century German women